Anthony Nted Emmanuel, also known as Comrade Tony Nted (born 1st October 1960) is a Nigerian unionist and industrialist. He was president of the Maritime Workers' Union of Nigeria in 2009. He was previously the vice president of the Nigeria Labour Congress During his leadership of Maritime Workers' Union of Nigeria (MWUN), he was known for sanitizing the rot in the Nigerian maritime sector.

Comrade Emmanuel Tony Nte is a successful Businessman and he is regarded as one of the richest man in Rivers State. He hails from Agwut-Obolo Town in Andoni Local Government Area.

References

Nigerian businesspeople
Living people
Place of birth missing (living people)
1960 births